Diplacus cusickii is a species of monkeyflower known by the common name Cusick's monkeyflower. It is native to the western United States, where it can be found in parts of the Pacific Northwest and Great Basin. It grows in moist spots in bare and scrubby habitat, rocky slopes and plateau.

Description
This is a hairy annual herb producing an erect stem up to about 24 centimeters tall. The pointed oval leaves are up to about 4.5 centimeters long, the herbage green to reddish in color. The tubular base of the flower corolla is encapsulated in a hairy calyx of sepals with unequal pointed lobes at its mouth. The corolla is 2 to 3 cm long and pink in color with yellow blotches in the throat.

References

External links
Jepson Manual Treatment
USDA Plants Profile
Photo gallery

cusickii
Flora of the Northwestern United States
Flora of California
Flora of Nevada
Flora without expected TNC conservation status